Jessica Love, born 1978 (45 years) is an American theater actress, author, and illustrator. She grew up in Southern California raised by her parents, who were quite artistic.She attended the University of California Santa Cruz where she received her bachelor's in fine arts. She then attended Juliard's drama program and graduated with her master's in 2009. 

She is now known for her debut children's picture book Julián is a Mermaid, but before publishing she worked as an actress in New York City for thirteen years. She refers to her book as "her backstage baby" as she worked on it between a Jez Butterworth's The River (2014) AND Julia Cho's Aubergine at Playwrights Horizons (2016). During this time she spent five years writing and illustrating Julián is a Mermaid before finding a publisher. The book was praised by critics and won the Stonewall Book Award and the Klaus Flugge prize. In 2019 she announced a new picture book, Julián at the Wedding, which was released in October 2020. In July 2022 she announced she will be releasing another picture book, A Bed of Stars, which will be released in April 2023. Her books are very LBTQ+ friendly.

She currently lives in Hudson Valley with her partner, Daniel, and their son. They were friends for twenty years before they became romantically involved and have been for the last five years.

Books 
 Julián is a Mermaid Candlewick Press April 2018 Jessica Love. It has been translated into fourteen different languages: Catalan, Portuguese, Italian, Chinese, Danish, German, Spanish, Finnish, Norwegian, Swedish, French, Japanese, Dutch, and Korean.
 Julián at the Wedding Candlewick Press. October 2022 Jessica Love
 I Love You Because I Love You. HarperCollins. January 2022. Written by Mượn Thị Văn and illustrated by Jessica Love
 Will it Be Okay? HarperCollins September 2022. Written by Crescent Dragonwagon and illustrated by Jessica Love.
 A Bed of Stars Candlewick Press. April 2023 Jessica Love

Style 
Love hand illustrated each of her books  using ink, gouache, and watercolor. An interesting aspect of her Julián books is she uses brown paper. She tried white paper originally, however she says, "something about it just wasn't working." When first starting to write Julián is a Mermaid Love states that it "was going to be entirely wordless.. but it became clear to me as I showed early sketches of the book to people that there was some information that was missing, and without it the story wouldn't actually make sense." Now she has included some words, but has been very careful to not overwrite the book or take your focus away from the illustrations.

In her newest book A Bed of Stars she explored her creativity in a more natural aspect looking at the nature around her.

Plot 
Julián is a Mermaid is about a little boy riding this bus with his grandma when he notices three women dressed up as mermaids (colorful and beautiful) and goes home to dress up like a mermaid. The story follows how he feels about himself and how his abuela feels about her grandson discovering another aspect of himself. 

Julián at the Wedding in this book Julián and his abuela go to a wedding, where he is the wedding. At the wedding he makes a friend Marisol and together they create their own mischief and understand the value of friends.

A Bed of Stars is about a father who goes camping in the desert with his child. She says, “shake hands with the universe” is the line that best explains this book.

Awards 

 Julián is a Mermaid received the Stonewall Book Award, the Klaus Flugge Prize (2019), the Illustrator Honor Award from the Ezra Jack Keats Foundation (2019), the Bologna Ragazzi Award (2019), the Children's Book NAIBA Book of the Year Award (2018), Best Book ford Kids (2018), Amazon Editor's Picks: Best Books of the Year Ages 3 to 5, Best Children and YA Books (2018), Notable Children's Books (2019), and NPR's Book Concierge (2018).
 Julián at the Wedding received the Publishers Weekly Best Children's Book of the Year (2020)

Inspiration 

 She is most inspired by: Maurice Sendak, Hillary Knight, Bill Waterson, Shel Silverstein, John Klassen, Mac Barnett, and Carson Ellis.
 Her inspiration for Julián is a Mermaid, by a friend who transitioned later on in life and Love was inspired by his story and the struggles he had to go through to live his life as his truest self. After hearing his story and starting to understand drag through Paris is Burning she wanted to create a story about how the love of a community affects a child's view on themselves.

References

External links 
 

Living people
Place of birth missing (living people)
21st-century American actresses
American women children's writers
American children's writers
American women illustrators
21st-century American writers
21st-century American women writers
Stonewall Book Award winners
1982 births